The PMPC Star Award for Best Comedy Actor and the PMPC Star Award for Best Comedy Actress are given to the best actors and actresses, respectively, in a Philippine television comedy of the year.

Best Comedy Actor winners and nominations

1980s

1990s

2000s

2010s
2010: Ogie Alcasid (Bubble Gang / GMA 7)

2011: Ogie Alcasid (Bubble Gang / GMA 7)

2012: Robin Padilla (Toda Max / ABS-CBN 2)

2013: Michael V. (Bubble Gang / GMA 7)

2014: Sef Cadayona (Bubble Gang / GMA 7)

2015: Jayson Gainza (Banana Split: Extra Scoop / ABS-CBN 2)

2016: Jose Manalo (Hay Bahay / GMA 7)

2017: Jobert Austria (Banana Sundae / ABS-CBN 2)

2018: Ogie Alcasid (Home Sweetie Home / ABS-CBN 2)

2019: Bayani Agbayani (Home Sweetie Home: Extra Sweet / ABS-CBN 2)

2020s
2021: Vic Sotto (Daddy's Gurl / GMA 7)

Multiple awards

Best Comedy Actress winners and nominations

1980s

1990s

2000s

2010s
2010: Angelica Panganiban (Banana Split / ABS-CBN 2)

2011: Ai-Ai delas Alas (M3: Malay Mo Ma-develop / ABS-CBN 2)

2012: Pokwang (Toda Max / ABS-CBN 2) & Rufa Mae Quinto (Bubble Gang / GMA 7) [tied]

2013: Rufa Mae Quinto (Bubble Gang / GMA 7)

2014: Rufa Mae Quinto (Bubble Gang / GMA 7)

2015: Rufa Mae Quinto (Bubble Gang / GMA 7)

2016: Manilyn Reynes (Pepito Manaloto / GMA 7)

2017: Ai-Ai delas Alas (Hay, Bahay! / GMA 7)

2018: Rufa Mae Quinto (Home Sweetie Home / ABS-CBN 2)

2019: Maine Mendoza (Daddy's Gurl / GMA 7)

2020s
2021: Manilyn Reynes (Pepito Manaloto / GMA 7)

Multiple awards

References

PMPC Star Awards for Television